Chaetostoma, also known as the bristlemouth catfish, is a genus of suckermouth armored catfishes native to South America with one species, C. fischeri, extending into Panama. Most species inhabit flowing rivers in the lower Andes and its foothills. Some species are kept in unheated aquaria.

Species

These are the currently recognized species in this genus:
 Chaetostoma aburrensis (Posada, 1909)
 Chaetostoma anale (Fowler, 1943)
 Chaetostoma anomalum Regan, 1903
 Chaetostoma bifurcum Lujan, Meza-Vargas, Astudillo-Clavijo, Barriga-S. & López-Fernández, 2015
 Chaetostoma branickii Steindachner, 1881
 Chaetostoma breve Regan, 1904
 Chaetostoma brevilabiatum Dahl, 1942
 Chaetostoma carrioni (Norman, 1935) 
 Chaetostoma changae Salcedo, 2006
 Chaetostoma chimu Urbano-Bonilla & Ballen, 2020
 Chaetostoma daidalmatos Salcedo, 2006
 Chaetostoma dermorhynchum Boulenger, 1887 
 Chaetostoma dorsale C. H. Eigenmann, 1922
 Chaetostoma dupouii Fernández-Yépez, 1945
 Chaetostoma fischeri Steindachner, 1879
 Chaetostoma floridablancaensis Ardila Rodríguez, 2013
 Chaetostoma formosae Ballen, 2011
 Chaetostoma guairense Steindachner, 1881
 Chaetostoma jegui Rapp Py-Daniel, 1991
 Chaetostoma joropo Ballen, Urbano-Bonilla & Maldonado-Ocampo, 2016
 Chaetostoma lepturum Regan, 1912
 Chaetostoma leucomelas C. H. Eigenmann, 1918
 Chaetostoma lexa (Salcedo, 2013) 
 Chaetostoma lineopunctatum C. H. Eigenmann & W. R. Allen, 1942
 Chaetostoma loborhynchos Tschudi, 1846
 Chaetostoma machiquense Fernández-Yépez & Martín Salazar, 1953
 Chaetostoma marginatum Regan, 1904
 Chaetostoma marmorescens C. H. Eigenmann & W. R. Allen, 1942
 Chaetostoma microps Günther, 1864
 Chaetostoma milesi Fowler, 1941
 Chaetostoma niveum Fowler, 1944
 Chaetostoma nudirostre Lütken, 1874
 Chaetostoma palmeri Regan, 1912
 Chaetostoma patiae Fowler, 1945
 Chaetostoma paucispinis Regan, 1912
 Chaetostoma pearsei C. H. Eigenmann, 1920
 Chaetostoma platyrhynchus Fowler, 1943
 Chaetostoma sovichthys L. P. Schultz, 1944
 Chaetostoma spondylus Salcedo & H. Ortega, 2015
 Chaetostoma stannii Lütken, 1874
 Chaetostoma stroumpoulos Salcedo, 2006
 Chaetostoma tachiraense L. P. Schultz, 1944
 Chaetostoma taczanowskii Steindachner, 1882
 Chaetostoma thomsoni Regan, 1904
 Chaetostoma trimaculineum Lujan, Meza-Vargas, Astudillo-Clavijo, Barriga-S. & López-Fernández, 2015
 Chaetostoma vagum Fowler, 1943
 Chaetostoma vasquezi Lasso A. & Provenzano, 1998
 Chaetostoma venezuelae (L. P. Schultz, 1944)
 Chaetostoma yurubiense Ceas & Page, 1996

References

 
Catfish genera
Taxa named by Johann Jakob von Tschudi